Main Directorate for Internal Affairs of Samara (Управления МВД России по городу Самаре; commonly Самарская полиция) is the main law enforcement force in Samara, subordinated to the Mayor of Samara and the Municipality of Samara.

Headquarters is located in Morisa Toreza 12 Street in Samara, Russia

Chief of Police
The police in Samara has been formed on January 1, 1980 as the Internal affairs Department of Kuibyshev, and the first police commander was Constantine Kremenskov, who lead the police from 1980 until 1996.

Constantine Kremenskov (1980–1996)
Vladimir Popov (1996–1999)
Vyacheslav Rakhlin (1999–2006)
Alexey Shcherbakov (2006–2009)
Dmitry Blokhin (Since 2009)

External links
Official Website

Samara, Russia
Law enforcement agencies of Russia
Organizations established in 1980